Texas Tornado is the second solo album by Doug Sahm, released by Atlantic Records in December 1973. Sahm co-produced the album with Jerry Wexler and Arif Mardin. Wexler signed Sahm to Atlantic records after the opening of the label's country music division. 

Sahm recorded with Atlantic during October 1972. Texas Tornado was constituted by the leftover tracks of his debut album, Doug Sahm and Band. Sahm's second album was favored by the critics.

Background
Interested in the development of alternative country, Atlantic Records producer Jerry Wexler started a Country & Western division in the label in 1972. Wexler signed Doug Sahm among his acts. Sahm recorded material for the label during October 1972 and his debut solo album, Doug Sahm and Band, was released in 1973. Following his move to Austin, Texas Sahm released the leftover material of his Atlantic sessions as Texas Tornado. The album was credited to the "Sir Douglas Band" and produced by Sahm, Wexler and Arif Mardin.

Release and reception

Texas Tornado was released in December 1973. The Kansas City Star delivered a favorable review that stated on the album Sahm "proves just how good a writer, composer and vocalist ... [he] is." Critic Bob Talbert of the Detroit Free Press favored the album, and commented on the variety of musical genres and Sahm's "taste of every musical style." Meanwhile, The Cincinnati Enquirer also remarked the mixture of styles and Sahm's voice changing from "the twangy nasal country sound to the mellow crooning style". the Austin American-Statesman considered the album "more consistent overall" in comparison to Sahm's debut release with the label.

Critic Robert Christgau gave the album a B+, and he compared it with previous Sahm releases: "the singing especially has the kind of force and definition he's always rendered irrelevant in the past". AllMusic gave the album four-and-a-half stars out of five. Stephen Thomas Erlewine  determined that the album "captures (Sahm) at an undeniable peak and it's undeniably irresistible."

Track listing

Personnel

Musicians

Doug Sahm - vocals, guitar, bajo sexto, fiddle, electric piano
Flaco Jiménez - accordion
Augie Meyers - Vox Continental
David "Fathead" Newman - tenor saxophone, flute
Dr. John - piano, organ
David Bromberg - dobro
Kenny Kosek - fiddle
Andy Statman - mandolin
Mike Nock - electric piano
George Stubbs - electric piano
George Rains - drums
Rocky Morales - tenor saxophone
Martin Fierro - tenor saxophone
Mel Martin - tenor and baritone saxophone
Wayne Jackson - trumpet
Jack Wilmoth - trumpet
Charley MacBirney - trumpet
Neil Rosengarden - flugelhorn
Jack Barber - bass
Steve Vargas - bass
Frank Paredes - rhythm guitar, vocals
Luis Ortéga - rhythm guitar, vocals
Atwood Allen - acoustic guitar, harmony
Charlie Owens - steel guitar
Pancho Morales - percussion
Warren Chiasson - vibraphone

Studio
Doug Sahm - producer, arrangements
Jerry Wexler - producer
Arif Mardin - producer
Jimmy Douglass - engineer
Dan Healy - mixing
Lew Hahn - mixing
Ken Hopkins - engineer, mixing

References

Sources

 
 

 
 

 

 

1973 albums
Doug Sahm albums
albums produced by Jerry Wexler
albums produced by Arif Mardin
Atlantic Records albums